Yeshivat Rambam Maimonides Academy was an elite Orthodox Jewish dual-curriculum day school and yeshiva in Baltimore, Maryland.  It encompassed kindergarten through twelfth grade, as well as an early childhood center.

History 
The school was founded in 1991. Yeshivat Rambam grew over the years, adding several grades, outgrowing its original location on Pimlico Road and purchasing the former Har Sinai Congregation property on Park Heights Avenue when that congregation moved to Owings Mills. Eventually, Yeshivat Rambam added a middle school and high school, and it built enrollment to about 400 students. Its first high school class graduated in 2001.

During its existence, Yeshivat Rambam was earned recognition as a National Blue Ribbon School of Excellence for its high scholastic performance, as measured by SAT and other standardized tests, consistently exceeding 95th percentile across all measures. The school produced several notable alumni including numerous well-known Rabbis, physicists, mathematicians, scientists, physicians and policy-makers in the United States and Israel. The school had a 0% dropout rate and an average student:teacher ratio of 8:1. Its founding Head of School was Dr. Rita Shloush.

In the mid to late 2000s, Yeshivat Rambam ran into financial difficulties, having accumulated significant debt due to its resource-intensive educational strategies and other factors, and those problems sparked annual rumors about its doors closing. Donations dropped off during the Great Recession and about 60 Rambam families had moved to Israel since the school was founded in 1991, eroding its base in Park Heights. In addition, the school became gender-segregated, with the girls division remaining on the Park Heights campus and the boys division moving to the nearby Jewish Community Center.

On May 8, 2011, the executive board announced that Yeshivat Rambam would close in June 2011, at the end of the academic year.

Successor 
Following the permanent closure of Yeshivat Rambam, some of its former faculty members remained to found another Orthodox Jewish day school in the area, Ohr Chadash Academy. Unlike Yeshivat Rambam, the school serves only preschool through eighth grades, but follows identical curriculum and principles.

References 

Defunct schools in Maryland
Education in Baltimore
Jewish day schools in Maryland
Private schools in Baltimore
Educational institutions established in 1991
Educational institutions disestablished in 2011
1991 establishments in Maryland
2011 disestablishments in Maryland